Salman Al-Moasher (born 5 October 1988) is a Saudi Arabian footballer who plays as a winger for Pro League club Al-Ahli and the Saudi Arabia national team.

Career 
Salman Al-Moasher started his career at Heraa in his hometown of Mecca. In 2005, he received offers from Al-Ahli, Al-Nassr and Al-Shabab. He also received an offer from Khaled Al-Hubaish, the head of youth development at Al Hilal at the time, to join Al-Hilal's youth team. Al-Moasher eventually agreed to Al-Hilal's offer and officially joined their youth team.

Al-Moasher made his first-team debut for Al-Hilal on 7 January 2008 in the league match against Al-Wehda. He scored the only goal of the game in the 45th minute. On 12 January 2008, Al-Moasher scored his second goal for the club as Al-Hilal defeated Al-Wehda 3–1 at home. Despite scoring twice, Al-Moasher was unable to break into the first team and made just 4 appearances throughout all competitions in the 2007–08 season. On 15 December 2008, Al-Moasher made his final appearance for the club in the 2–0 away win against Al-Raed. In January 2010, Al-Moasher joined Al-Qadsiah on loan until the end of the season. However, he failed to make a single appearance for the club and returned to Al-Hilal following the conclusion of the season.

On 20 January 2011, Al-Moasher joined Al-Wehda on a three-and-a-half-year contract. He made his debut for the club on 12 February 2011 in the league match against former club Al-Hilal. He scored twice and assisted five times in 18 matches throughout all competitions as Al-Wehda finished as runners-up in the Crown Prince Cup. Despite his best efforts, Al-Wehda were relegated at the end of the season after they were docked three points. In his second season at the club, Al-Moasher scored 14 league goals helping Al-Wehda finish second in the First Division thus earning promotion to the Pro League. In the 2012–13 season, Al-Moasher scored once and assisted three times in 21 league matches. However, Al-Wehda finished 14th and were relegated at the end of the season. Following Al-Wehda's relegation to the First Division, Al-Moahser was linked to moves to Al-Ittihad and Al-Nassr. However, a move wasn't materialized and Al-Moasher remained at Al-Wehda. In his fourth and final season at the club, Al-Moasher scored 11 goals in 28 appearances and finished as the club's top scorer. However, Al-Wehda finished third and failed to gain promotion to the Pro League. Al-Moasher refused to sign a new contract with the club and left following the conclusion of the season.

On 13 May 2014, Al-Moasher joined Al-Ahli on a free transfer. He signed a three-year contract with the club. He made his debut for the club on 22 September 2014 in the Crown Prince Cup match against Hajer. He made his league debut on 27 September 2014 against Al-Shoulla. Al-Moasher scored his first goal for Al-Ahli in the 4–2 away win against Al-Raed on 25 October 2014. In the final league match of the season, Al-Moasher scored the equalizer against derby rivals Al-Ittihad. This meant that Al-Ahli would end their season unbeaten. However, despite ending the league unbeaten, Al-Ahli finished in second place. In his second season at the club, Al-Moasher played a vital role in helping Al-Ahli win the domestic double.

Career statistics

Club

International
Statistics accurate as of match played 10 September 2019.

International goals
Scores and results list Saudi Arabia's goal tally first.

Honours
Al-Hilal
Pro League: 2007–08
Crown Prince Cup: 2007–08, 2008–09

Al-Ahli
Pro League: 2015–16
King Cup: 2016
Crown Prince Cup: 2014–15
Saudi Super Cup: 2016

References 

1987 births
Living people
Heraa FC players
Al Hilal SFC players
Al-Qadsiah FC players
Al-Ahli Saudi FC players
Al-Wehda Club (Mecca) players
Saudi Arabia international footballers
Saudi Arabian footballers
Sportspeople from Mecca
Saudi First Division League players
Saudi Professional League players
Association football wingers